State Route 258 (SR 258, OH 258) is a state highway that runs  in eastern Ohio. It travels from US 36 in Newcomerstown to SR 800 in Rush Township community of Stillwater. Most of the route is in Tuscarawas County but the route briefly enters Guernsey and Harrison Counties.

Route description
SR 258 begins at a signalized intersection with US 36 in Newcomertown, Tuscarawas County. The route heads south as Piling Street before crossing the Tuscarawas River and turning east. The route parallels the river and farmland until it crosses under I-77 without an interchange. The route heads southeast into more hilly terrain. After climbing a hill, SR 258 turns left. On this alignment, the route generally stays on the hills' ridges as it passes the community of Peoli and briefly dips into Guernsey County. Now heading northeast, SR 258 reenters Tuscarawas County and enters the small community of West Chester. In the center of town, SR 258 reaches the western terminus of SR 342; at this stop-controlled intersection, SR 258 heads north and begins a descent to a valley. As it travels in a flat area curving around surrounding hills, the route enters Harrison County. The route reenters Tuscarawas County one last time before curving northeast and southeast in the community of Stillwater where it ends at a stop-controlled intersection with SR 800.

No segments of SR 258 are included within the National Highway System.

History
SR 258 was first designated around 1926 on an alignment between Washington Township at US 21 and SR 8 in Stillwater. This routing would remain intact until it was extended to Newcomerstown between 1967 and 1969. US 21 was removed from the state highway system upon the completion of I-77 and SR 258 was signed along the former US 21 routing from Washington Township to Newcomerstown. Also around this time, SR 8 at SR 258's eastern terminus became SR 800. Since then, there have been no major changes along the route.

Major intersections

References

External links

258
Transportation in Tuscarawas County, Ohio
Transportation in Guernsey County, Ohio
Transportation in Harrison County, Ohio